Patrick Louis (born 22 October 1955, Vitry-le-François) is a French politician who served as a Member of the European Parliament for the south-east of France. He is a member of the Movement for France, which is part of the Independence and Democracy group, and sat on the European Parliament's Committee on Transport and Tourism.

He was also a substitute for the Committee on International Trade and a member of the delegations for relations with the Gulf States, including Yemen, for relations with the Mashreq countries, and to the ACP-EU Joint Parliamentary Assembly.

Career
 University teaching qualification in economics and management (1984)
 Visiting lecturer at the Franco-Czech Management Institute in Prague (1993)
 Visiting lecturer at Bucharest (1995)
 Visiting lecturer at the University of Georgia (United States) (1997)
 Visiting lecturer at the University of Minnesota (1991, 1994, 2000)
 Visiting lecturer at the Beirut College of Commerce (2004)
 Examiner at the Institute for Advanced Studies in National Defence
 Lecturer at Jean Moulin University, Lyon
 Administrator, Interregional and Technical Union of Students' Mutual Associations
 MPF regional officer (1994–2002)
 RPF departmental secretary for Rhône (2000)
 MPF regional coordinator for the Rhône-Alpes region
 Member of Rhône-Alpes Regional Council (1998–2004)
 Chairman of the Transport Committee of the Rhône-Alpes Regional Council (1998–1999)
 Member of the TRANSALP public interest group
 Cofounder of the movement 'Combat pour les valeurs' (Combat for Values)
 Le Budgétaire, First, 1989 (collective work)
 Encyclopédie de l'économie et de la gestion, Hachette, 1991 (collective work)
 Knight of the Ordre des Palmes académiques

External links
 Official website (in French)
 European Parliament biography
 Declaration of financial interests (in French; PDF file)

1955 births
Living people
People from Vitry-le-François
MEPs for South-East France 2004–2009
Movement for France MEPs
Chevaliers of the Ordre des Palmes Académiques